is a Japanese former international table tennis player.

He won a bronze medal at the 1997 World Table Tennis Championships in the men's doubles with Kōji Matsushita and three years later won another bronze at the 2000 World Team Table Tennis Championships.

His father was Goro Shibutani and they became the first father and son to win the All-Japan Singles title.

See also
 List of table tennis players

References

Japanese male table tennis players
Living people
1967 births
Table tennis players at the 1992 Summer Olympics
Table tennis players at the 1996 Summer Olympics
Table tennis players at the 2000 Summer Olympics
Asian Games medalists in table tennis
Table tennis players at the 1986 Asian Games
Table tennis players at the 1998 Asian Games
Olympic table tennis players of Japan
Medalists at the 1986 Asian Games
Medalists at the 1998 Asian Games
Asian Games bronze medalists for Japan
World Table Tennis Championships medalists